Survivor: All-Stars is the eighth season of the American CBS competitive reality television series Survivor. It was filmed from November 3, 2003, through December 11, 2003, and premiered on February 1, 2004, after Super Bowl XXXVIII. It was filmed on the Pearl Islands of Panama, also the location of the previous season. Hosted by Jeff Probst, it consisted of the usual 39 days of gameplay with, for the first time, 18 returning competitors from the seven previous seasons instead of the usual 16 new contestants, and three tribes instead of the usual two.

The winner was Survivor: The Australian Outback castaway Amber Brkich, who was declared the Sole Survivor after a victory over Survivor: Marquesas castaway Rob "Boston Rob" Mariano with a 4–3 jury vote. The two had been closely allied throughout the game, and at the live reunion show just before the votes were read, Brkich accepted a marriage proposal from Mariano. At the end of the live reunion show, a twist called America's Tribal Council was announced. It involved the public voting to award a second million-dollar prize. Rupert Boneham won the million dollars over runners-up Mariano, Colby Donaldson, and Tom Buchanan.

Casting
Producer Mark Burnett stated that "the casting was really, really scientific. I got a yellow legal pad and wrote down 24 names, and [then] cut down to 18. It was that quick." He confirmed that two former contestants turned down formal offers: Elisabeth Filarski Hasselbeck from The Australian Outback, who had recently taken a job as a co-host of The View, and Colleen Haskell of the show's premiere season, who "had moved on with her life" and "just genuinely didn't want to go through that again." Jenna Lewis and Amber Brkich were chosen to replace the two. Other contestants who were considered, but ultimately cut included Kelly Goldsmith and Teresa Cooper from Africa, Neleh Dennis and Sean Rector from  Marquesas, and Clay Jordan and Helen Glover from Thailand. Sandra Diaz-Twine, winner of Pearl Islands was asked to participate on the season, but declined due to parasites she had contracted in the Pearl Islands. She would eventually return for Heroes vs. Villains, Game Changers, and Winners at War. Heidi Strobel from The Amazon was also offered a spot on All-Stars, but she turned down the offer.

Contestants
The eighteen returning contestants were divided into three tribes of six: Chapera, Mogo Mogo, and Saboga.

Future appearances
Rob Mariano, Rupert Boneham, Colby Donaldson, and Jerri Manthey returned to Survivor again in the show's twentieth season, Survivor: Heroes vs. Villains. Mariano played again in Survivor: Redemption Island and returned in the thirty-ninth season as a mentor in Survivor: Island of the Idols. Boneham and Tina Wesson returned for Survivor: Blood vs. Water. Boneham returned with his wife, Laura, who appeared on this season as loved one; whereas Wesson returned with her daughter, Katie Collins. Ethan Zohn, Amber Brkich (now Mariano), and Rob Mariano returned again for Survivor: Winners at War.

Several of the cast also later competed in other reality competition shows. Mariano and Brkich competed together on The Amazing Race 7 and The Amazing Race 11. Richard Hatch competed in the eleventh season of The Apprentice and the seventeenth season of The Biggest Loser. Zohn and Jenna Morasca competed against each other on a "Reality All-Stars" episode of Fear Factor and competed together on The Amazing Race 19. Boneham competed on The Amazing Race 31 with his wife Laura. After his appearances on Survivor, Colby Donaldson hosted Top Shot, which ran on the History Channel for five seasons. He has also hosted other shows such as Top Guns, The Butcher, and Alone.

Season summary
Eighteen players from previous seasons were divided into three tribes of six: Chapera, Mogo Mogo, and Saboga. Saboga lost the first two immunity challenges and, during a shelter-building challenge, built a shelter that quickly flooded. Saboga's poor conditions caught up to them and, after losing a crucial reward challenge, the four remaining members were divided between the other two tribes. Chapera accepted the newcomers, Rupert and Jenna L., and the two entered a solid majority alliance with de facto leader Rob M. and his closest ally and romantic interest Amber. Rob and Amber also had alliances with the other members of the tribe, however a winning streak ensured that they never had to break any of them. Mogo Mogo struggled after Lex decided to vote out the stronger members of the tribe in order to cement his control, causing Mogo Mogo to continually lose challenges and approach the merge in the minority.

Two players voluntarily left the game. Jenna Morasca, fearing for her mother's health, decided to drop out on Day 9 and return to her mother's side; her mother would die eight days later from cancer. Sue Hawk also left, distraught after an incident during an immunity challenge in which a naked Richard Hatch had brief but inappropriate bodily contact with her.

With ten players remaining, a tribal switch was held where players took new headbands out of Jeff's bag. In an odd and crazy twist of fate, each player simply drew a buff of the opposite tribe color except Amber, with the net effect of having Amber forced into the old Mogo Mogo tribe under the Chapera name. After Chapera lost the next immunity challenge, Rob whispered a deal to Lex to save Amber, promising that he will make it up to him later in the game. 

Rob and his former tribe mates continued to dominate the rest of the game, systematically eliminating the rest of Lex's alliance. Rob and Amber then honored their deal with Rupert and Jenna L., eliminating the rest of the original Chapera tribe. After convincing Jenna to vote Rupert out in order to avoid a tie, Rob won the final immunity challenge and took Amber into the final two. It was recognized by the jury that the finalists played as a pair, however Rob's strategic gameplay was deemed more outwardly vicious than Amber's quieter and more social game. The jury decided that Rob had been too aggressive in his handling of the jury, choosing Amber as the winner in a vote of 4–3.

In the case of multiple tribes or castaways who win reward or immunity, they are listed in order of finish, or alphabetically where it was a team effort; where one castaway won and invited others, the invitees are in brackets.

Episodes

Voting history

Notes

America's Tribal Council
Survivor: America's Tribal Council was a special episode that was broadcast live on CBS on May 13, 2004, four days after the All-Stars finale. The special was announced at the All-Stars finale in lieu of the typical announcement of the upcoming Survivor season, and revealed in tandem with an additional million-dollar prize awarded to the All-Stars contestant who received the most votes from the public, which was awarded at the end of the special. Throughout the special, Rupert Boneham, Tom Buchanan, Colby Donaldson, and Rob Mariano were revealed to be the top four vote-getters, with Boneham ultimately being revealed as the winner with roughly 85% of the approximately 38 million votes cast. In addition to the million dollar prize, viewers voted on several other awards, the results of which were also revealed throughout the special.

Sexiest Male
Greg Buis (Borneo)
Gervase Peterson (Borneo)
Colby Donaldson (Australian Outback)
Ethan Zohn (Africa)
Hunter Ellis (Marquesas)
Rob Mariano (Marquesas)
Robb Zbacnik (Thailand)
Alex Bell (Amazon)
Burton Roberts (Pearl Islands)
Andrew Savage (Pearl Islands)

Sexiest Female
Colleen Haskell (Borneo)
Amber Brkich (Australian Outback)
Alicia Calaway (Australian Outback)
 Elisabeth Filarski (Australian Outback)
Jerri Manthey (Australian Outback)
Sarah Jones (Marquesas)
Erin Collins (Thailand)
Jenna Morasca (Amazon)
 Heidi Strobel (Amazon)
 Darrah Johnson (Pearl Islands)

Best Villain
Richard Hatch (Borneo)
Jerri Manthey (Australian Outback)
Brian Heidik (Thailand)
Rob Cesternino (Amazon)
Jonny Fairplay (Pearl Islands)

Best Fight
Alicia Calaway vs. Kimmi Kappenberg (Australian Outback)
Ghandia Johnson vs. Ted Rogers, Jr. (Thailand)
Clay Jordan vs. Robb Zbacnik (Thailand)
Rupert Boneham vs. Jonny Fairplay (Pearl Islands)
Rob Mariano vs. Lex van den Berghe (All Stars)

Most Memorable Moment
Sue Hawk (Borneo) – Compared finalists Richard Hatch and Kelly Wiglesworth to a snake and a rat, respectively, during her jury speech
Michael Skupin (Australian Outback) – Was removed from the game after passing out and falling into a fire
Jenna Morasca and Heidi Strobel (Amazon) – Took off their clothes for chocolate and peanut butter during an immunity challenge
Rupert Boneham (Pearl Islands) – Stole then sold shoes belonging to the opposing tribe
Jonny Fairplay (Pearl Islands) – Plotted with his loved one to claim that his grandmother died to gain fellow castaways' sympathy

Reception
The season has received mixed reviews from fans and critics with many criticizing the boot order of the cast as many of the memorable players were voted out before the jury phase of the game. The Susan Hawk and Richard Hatch incident also soured fans of the show with many calling it "uncomfortable." Michael Favaro of Surviving Tribal called this season underwhelming and the "most painful to watch out of the (then) four all returnee seasons." Dalton Ross of Entertainment Weekly ranked this season 26th out of 40 calling it "a bit of a letdown." In 2015, a poll by Rob Has a Podcast ranked this season 16th out of 30 with Rob Cesternino ranking this season 17th. This was updated in 2021 during Cesternino's podcast, Survivor All-Time Top 40 Rankings, ranking 24th out of 40. In 2020, Survivor fan site "Purple Rock Podcast" ranked this season 25th out of 40 saying that the season "features one of the most uncomfortable incidents in the show’s history, and it is not handled well. But despite that, there is some decent gameplay here- just be prepared for a very angry final tribal council." Later that same year, Inside Survivor ranked this season 29th out of 40 calling it "an uncomfortable season to sit through, but it does have an epic feel, especially across the first three or four episodes." In 2021, Kristen Kranz of Collider ranked All-Stars as the 9th best season of the series and praised the unexpected romance between Brkich and Mariano which, "sort of set the stage for cementing flirting as a game strategy, one that countless other players will utilize in all seasons to come." In 2022, Entertainment Weekly ranked Rob and Amber's romance 49th in its list of The 100 Best TV Romances of All Time.

References

External links
 Official CBS Survivor All Stars Website

08
2004 American television seasons
Super Bowl lead-out shows
2003 in Panama
Television shows filmed in Panama